James Hodge may refer to:

 James Hodge (politician) (1879–1946), British Liberal politician and lawyer
 James L. Hodge (born c. 1954), United States Army general
 James Hodge (administrator) (1876–1931), secretary of the Port Adelaide Football Club
 James Hodge (diplomat) (born 1943), British diplomat
 Jimmy Hodge (1890–1970), Scottish footballer

See also
 James Hodges (disambiguation)